Dani Menkin (Hebrew : דני מנקין, born June 22, 1970) is a Los Angeles-based multi-awardwinning writer, director, and film producer. He is a two-time Israeli Academy Award winner and the founder of film production company Hey Jude Productions.

Biography 
Menkin's professional career began in 1994, when he joined the Israeli Sports Channel (Sport5) as a reporter. In 1995, he moved to Israeli channel 2, where he covered the Sports Section in the popular program "HaDaka ha-91" with Yoram Arbel. Between the years 1998 to 2004 he directed articles for the investigative program  with Ilana Dayan. In 2001, Menkin worked in a series for National Geographic Society. During those years, Menkin was Director Supervisor for the Israeli cult film "Hochmat HaBeygale" ("The Wisdom of the Pretzel") along with the director Ilan Heitner.

Dani Menkin was awarded the Israeli Academy Award for  "39 Pounds of Love" (2005). The film, written, produced and directed by him, has been sold to HBO, and was short listed for the Oscars. His feature film "IS THAT YOU?" (2014) found success at several International Film Festivals, such as Hollywood, Montreal, Haifa and Syracuse Film Festivals, the 28th Israel Film Festival in LA, and the Jewish Film Festivals across the US. It has also won  "Best Indie Film of the Year" award (2014), and has been nominated for the "Best Film of the Year" award (2014) by the Israeli Academy.
Currently the film is opening in cinemas across Israel. Dani Menkin's award winning film Dolphin Boy (2011) won among several nominations and awards, the "Jury Mention Award" at the Jerusalem International Film Festival. Menkin directed and produced the documentary film along with Jonathan Nir.
The film tells the rehabilitation story of the lad Murad at the Dolphin Reef in Eilat. 
The film, which shot partly underwater, won several awards around the world and screened in many networks, among them - the French-German Arte  and British Channel 4. Dolphin Boy was sold to over 20 countries around the globe, and has been bought by Disney for a fiction adaptation.

Dani Menkin wrote, produced and directed the award winning film JE T'AIME - I LOVE YOU TERMINAL (2010). The film has participated and won International Festivals, including "Best Feature film" award at Houston International film festival. Dani Menkin is a co-producer and a creator-partner of Ilan Heitner for the Israeli cult indie film "WISDOM OF THE PRETZEL", which is one of the most successful independent feature films in Israeli cinema.

In 2005 Director, writer and producer Dani Menkin created his own independent film production company "Hey Jude Productions". You can visit the site at Hey Jude Productions. Menkin was inspired to name his company Hey Jude Productions due to Paul McCartney—he describes how he drew inspiration"from the line “Take A Sad Song And Make It Better”. Paul loves what he does, inspires millions with his uplifting, positive music and uses his fame to spread the message of peace and kindness throughout the world."Dani Menkin is a speaker at some distinguish panels over International Festivals around the world, as well as a juror and film professor in American and Israeli universities and colleges. He has collaborated with other filmmakers and creatives—most recently interviewing the creators of sports documentary miniseries The Last Dance, and featuring on a podcast alongside basketball all-star Chris Webber.

Directing career

Is That You? (2014) 
The story of Ronnie, 60-year-old Israeli film projectionist, who has been fired from his job and is going now to the U.S. in search of Rachel, the love of his youth. Is That You? is a romantic roadtrip journey. Menkin described an incident during the production of the film: 
"When I shot my feature narrative IS THAT YOU? We had a police man stop us and ask for a permit which we did not have with us. We were actually looking for a policeman character on our film so I told him, with my Israeli accent, that we will be happy to “shoot” him. He looked at me and paused… then said “you may wanna rephrase that…”. The film got a great review at the NY TIMES and is now performing successfully on AMAZON PRIME"

Je T'aime I Love You Terminal (2011) 

A romantic drama which follows Ben, a 29-year-old Israeli on his way to New York to re-join his fiancée and start his new life. During the flight he meets a flirtatious, outrageous, and somewhat dysfunctional Emma. Over the course of 24-hour connection in Prague, the two contemplate life, love, and relationships. Starring Israeli musician Danny Niv (Mooki)as Ben, and Naruna De-Macedo Kaplan as Emma.

39 Pounds of Love (2005) 

A documentary film which follows Ami Ankilewitz who was diagnosed at childhood with an extremely rare form of SMA/2 that severely limits his physical growth and movement. Ami was given 6 years to live and outlived the doctor's predictions to the age of 34. The film won multiple awards including the Ophir award in 2005.

Dolphin Boy (2011) 
 Directed along with Yonathan Nir, this documentary film tells the story of Morad, a teenage boy from an Arab village in the north of Israel, who have suffered a violent attack, which led him to a trauma. Morad stopped having contact with the outside world, and just before hospitalization in a mental institute, was taken by his father to be treated with Dolphins in Eilat. The film follows Morad's therapy over the course of four years.

On the Map (2016) 
 In 1977, the Maccabi Tel Aviv basketball team prevailed over CSKA Moscow (known in the West as Red Army), a team that refused to play against Israel. Moments after this highly charged and historical win, Israeli-American basketball hero Tal Brody captured the heart of the nation when he famously said, "Israel is on the map, not just in sport, but in everything." The story of this triumph against all odds is told through the eyes of six American basketball players who joined Maccabi Tel Aviv.

Picture of His Life (2019) 
 Directed alongside Yonatan Nir, this documentary film follows the journey of underwater photography Amos Nachoum as he sets off on a journey to photograph the world's largest carnivore: the polar bear. He tried before and barely escaped, but now, as he nears the end of his career, he is determined to give it one last shot. As the journey unfolds, Amos contemplates the series of unspoken events that drove him here, to the end of the world. It has been a long and painful journey, after serving in an Elite Commando unit and witnessing the horrors of war, but where others find fear, Amos finds redemption.

Aulcie (2020) 
"Aulcie" tells the inspiring story of Aulcie Perry, a basketball legend who led Maccabi Tel Aviv to an upset win in the European Championship. During the summer of 1976, Aulcie Perry was spotted by a scout for Maccabi Tel Aviv while playing at the Rucker courts in Harlem and was quickly signed to play for their fledgling team. The Israeli players immediately responded to Aulcie's leadership and that year they had what one Sports Illustrated writer described as "the most extraordinary season in its remarkable history" and what Perry later called "the best nine months of my life." In 1977, Perry helped the team to its first European Championship, a prize they took four years later again under his leadership. After the season, to the surprise of many, Aulcie Perry converted to Judaism, adopted the Hebrew name Elisha Ben Avraham, and became an Israeli citizen. This inspiring film tells the story of this remarkable athlete who captured the spirit of a nation, triumphant and victorious against all odds, and put Israel on the map.

Awards

Life Awards 

 Reel Difference from Seattle Jewish Film Festival
 San Diego Jewish Film Festival

Is That You? 

 Winner of the "Best Indie Film" of the year (2014) by Israeli Academy
 Nominated to "Best Film of the year" (2014) by Israeli Academy.

39 Pounds of Love 

 Winner of The Israeli Academy Awards “Ophir Awards”
 Winner of The Palm Beach International Film festival
 Winner of The Tallgrass Film Festival
 Winner of The Tahoe/Reno International film festival
 Winner of The Tssalonicki International film festival
 Winner of The Boston Jewish Film Festival
 Winner of The Atlanta Jewish Film Festivals
 Winner of The Israeli film Festival in New York
 Winner of The California Governor Awards.

Je Taime, I Love You Terminal 

 Winner of The Haifa International Film Festival, Distribution Awards
 Winner of The Bronze Palm Award at the 2011 Mexico International Film Festival.

Dolphin Boy 
 Winner First Prize in Antibes Underwater Film Festival
 Winner of The Special Jury Mention Awards at the Woodstock International Film Festival
 Winner of The Special Jury Mention Awards at the Jerusalem International Film Festival.

On the Map 

 Winner of the Audience Award for Best Documentary in the 2016 JCC Rochester International Jewish Film Festival
 Winner of the Audience Award for Best Documentary in the 2016 Berkshire Jewish Film Festival
 Winner of the Audience Award for Best Documentary in the 2016 Boston Jewish Film Festival
 Winner of the Audience Award for Best Documentary in the 2016 Rutgers Jewish Film Festival
 Winner of the Audience Choice Award: 2017 Donald M. Ephraim Palm Beach Jewish Film Festival 
 Winner of the Audience Award for Best Documentary: 2017 Denver Jewish Film Festival 
 Winner of the Audience Favorite Award:2017 Mayerson JCC Jewish & Israeli Film Festival in Cincinnati
 Winner of the Audience Choice Award: 2017 Houston Jewish Film Festival 
 Winner of the Audience Award: 2017 JFilm Festival: A Program of Film Pittsburgh
 Winner of the Audience Award for Best Documentary: The JCC Rockland 2017 Jewish Film Festival
 Winner of the Best Documentary Award in China: The 2017 Hong Kong Jewish Film Festival

Picture of His Life 

 Winner of the Audience Award in 2019 San Francisco Jewish Film Festival 
 Winner of Festival Award in 2019 Syracuse International Film Festival
 Winner in 2019 Israel Film Festival 
 Winner of the Audience Award in 2019 Gold Coast International Film Festival 
 Nominated for Audience and Israeli Competition Award in 2019 DocAviv Film Festival

References 

https://www.heyjudeproductions.com/
https://www.youtube.com/watch?v=9yWcw1l8isc&feature=youtu.be
https://www.youtube.com/watch?v=DK9Sdp5EkcI&feature=youtu.be

External links 
 
 Hey Jude Productions 
 
 
 
 
 
 
 
 
 
 Interview with Dani Menkin on 39 Pounds of Love - YouTube
 Interview with Dani Menkin and Judith Manassen Ramon at the Woodstock Film Festival 2011, on Dolphin Boy - YouTube

1970 births
Living people
Israeli film directors
Israeli film producers
Israeli male screenwriters
Film people from Tel Aviv